The 2018 OKC Energy FC season was the club's fifth season of existence, and their fifth consecutive season in the United Soccer League, the second tier of American soccer. Energy FC also played in the U.S. Open Cup. The season covered the period from November 5, 2017 to the beginning of the 2019 USL season.

The 2018 season was the first for OKC under new head coach Steve Cooke, who had previously been the interim head coach of Colorado Rapids. Cooke became just the second head coach in club history; Jimmy Nielsen had been in charge for the previous four seasons.

Energy FC finished tenth place in the Western Conference, missing the playoffs for just the second time in club history and the first time since 2014. OKC took points from 16 of their last 21 matches, after losing 10 of their first 13 games, but still finished 10 points outside the final playoff spot. In the U.S. Open Cup, Energy FC was knocked out by amateur club NTX Rayados, who play in the North Texas Premier Soccer Association. It marked the first season in club history in which OKC did not win at least one game in the cup.

Roster

Non-competitive

Preseason

Competitions

USL

Standings

Results summary

Results by round

Match results
In August 2017, the USL announced that the 2018 season would span 34 games, the longest regular season the league had ever run. The expansion was spurred by the addition of six new clubs for the 2018 season: Atlanta United 2, Fresno FC, Indy Eleven, Las Vegas Lights, Nashville SC, and North Carolina FC.

On January 12, 2018, the league announced home openers for every club. Energy FC opened their home slate with the season's first fixture of the Black Gold Derby against Tulsa Roughnecks, the second time in four years that Energy FC and Tulsa faced off in the season opener. The teams had previously faced off to open the 2015 season.

The schedule for the remainder of the 2018 season was released on January 19. Energy FC played three times against both Colorado Springs Switchbacks and Tulsa. They faced every other Western Conference team twice.

U.S. Open Cup

Statistics

Appearances and goals

Disciplinary record

Clean sheets

Transfers

In

Loan in

Out

Awards

USL Team of the Week

USL Save of the Week

Kits

See also
 OKC Energy FC
 2018 in American soccer
 2018 USL season

References

OKC Energy FC seasons
OKC Energy
OKC Energy
OKC Energy